Lambodar Mahto is an Indian politician from Jharkhand and the general secretary of the All Jharkhand Students Union (AJSU) Party Jharkhand. He is a member of Jharkhand Legislative Assembly from Gomia Constituency. He also served in Jharkhand Administrative Service.

Education
Ph.D from RU in 2012, MBA from Sikkim Manipal University in 2013.

References

External links

Jharkhand MLAs 2019–2024
Year of birth missing (living people)
Living people
All Jharkhand Students Union politicians